James Rudolph Cheatham (June 18, 1924 – January 12, 2007) was an American jazz trombonist and teacher, who played with Chico Hamilton, Ornette Coleman, Thad Jones, Mel Lewis, Lionel Hampton, Frank Foster, and Duke Ellington.

In 1978, Cheatham was invited to lead the jazz program at University of California, San Diego. In 1979 he began to direct the school's African American and jazz performance programs. He retired in 2005.

Biography
Cheatham was born  in Birmingham, Alabama on June 18, 1924, the son of Isabelle (née Steen) and Andrew Cheatham, who was a conductor on the Louisville and Nashville Railroad. After his parents separated when he was a small child, he grew up with his mother and sister, Arlene, in Buffalo, New York. In February 1943, he enlisted in the United States Army, and was a member of the 173rd Army Ground Force Band from 1944 to 1946, when he was demobilized following the end of World War II. At various times, his colleagues in the band included Eddie Chamblee, Chico Hamilton, Jo Jones, Lester Young, and also Harry White, whom Cheatham said had been "like a mentor" to him.

Taking advantage of the G.I. Bill, Cheatham was able to attend the New York Conservatory of Modern Music in Brooklyn from 1948 to 1950, then from 1950 to 1953 studied at the Westlake College of Music in Los Angeles, where he developed a lifelong friendship with one of his instructors, Russell Garcia. While at Westlake, a piece he wrote for string quartet was performed at a concert with Paul Robeson, and he also received a scholarship to the nearby American Operatic Laboratory. Amongst the visitors to the flat he shared with saxophonist Buddy Collette in Los Angeles were Charlie Parker, and the first Gerry Mulligan quartet (including Chico Hamilton) who went there to rehearse. 

Cheatham met his wife, Jean Evans, in 1956 in Buffalo, New York, when the local musicians' union chief called them separately to replace two musicians who could not make a job at the local Elks Ballroom. They married in 1959, and their son, Jonathan, was born the same year His wife also had a daughter from a previous relationship, Shirley, who was born in 1951.

During the 1970s, Cheatham taught jazz at Bennington College in Vermont, and also at the University of Wisconsin in Madison, Wisconsin.

In 1984, Cheatham and his wife won a bronze medal at the New York Festivals Film and TV Awards for the 1983 KPBS television special Three Generations of the Blues, which featured Sippie Wallace, Big Mama Thornton, and Jennie Cheatham.

Also in 1984, the Cheathams formed the Sweet Baby Blues Band, reviving Kansas City-style blues. Their fifth album, Luv in the Afternoon (1990), was also voted amongst the best blues albums of the year in Down Beat magazine's 39th annual poll of international music critics, as published in 1991.    
In 1998, the band was described as "an earthy jump blues combo that plays funky, hard-swinging, boogie-busting music".

Cheatham's legacy is carried on by several students who went on to become, like him, prominent composer/performer/educators: flutist Nicole Mitchell, bassist Karl E. H. Seigfried, and drummer Vikas Srivastava.

Cheatham died in San Diego, California on January 12, 2007, aged 82, having undergone heart surgery the previous month.

Discography

As co-leader

Studio albums

 Sweet Baby Blues (1985)Jeannie Cheatham and Jimmy Cheathamwith Red Callender, John "Ironman" Harris, Charles McPherson, Jimmy Noone, Curtis Peagler, Snooky YoungConcord Jazz
 Midnight Mama (1986)Jeannie and Jimmy Cheatham and the Sweet Baby Blues BandConcord Jazz
 Homeward Bound (1987)Jeannie and Jimmy Cheatham and the Sweet Baby Blues BandConcord Jazz
 Back to the Neighborhood (1989)Jeannie & Jimmy Cheatham and the Sweet Baby Blues BandConcord Jazz
 Luv in the Afternoon (1990)Jeannie & Jimmy Cheatham and the Sweet Baby Blues BandConcord Jazz
 Basket Full of Blues (1992)Jeannie and Jimmy Cheatham and the Sweet Baby Blues BandConcord Jazz
 Blues and the Boogie Masters (1993)Jeannie & Jimmy Cheatham and the Sweet Baby Blues BandConcord Jazz
 Gud Nuz Bluz (1996)Jeannie & Jimmy Cheatham and the Sweet Baby Blues BandConcord Jazz

Compilation albums

 Jenny and Jimmy Cheatham (1998)Jeannie & Jimmy CheathamConcord Jazz

As sideman
With Bill Dixon
 Intents and Purposes (RCA Victor, 1967)

With Chico Hamilton
 El Chico (Impulse!, 1965)
 The Further Adventures of El Chico (Impulse!, 1966)
 The Dealer (Impulse!, 1966)
 The Gamut  (Solid State, 1968)
 Juniflip (Joyous Shout, 2006)

With Grover Mitchell
 Meet Grover Mitchell (Jazz Chronicles, 1979)
 The Devil's Waltz (Jazz Chronicles, 1981)

Notes

References

External links
 Jeannie Cheatham official site

1924 births
2007 deaths
20th-century American male musicians
20th-century American musicians
20th-century trombonists
American blues musicians
American jazz trombonists
American music educators
Grand Prix du Disque winners
American male jazz musicians
Male trombonists
University of California, San Diego faculty